Secretly Group is a family of American independent record labels based in Bloomington, Indiana. The group is made up of Secretly Canadian, Jagjaguwar, and Dead Oceans. Secretly Canadian, the first of the labels, was formed in 1996 by brothers Chris and Ben Swanson, Eric Weddle, and Jonathan Cargill. Their first release was a re-issue of an album by June Panic. Weddle later left to form label Family Vineyard; the remaining trio were joined by Darius Van Arman, as well as his label Jagjaguwar, in 1999. The two labels had worked closely before Jagjaguwar's offices moved to Bloomington to work alongside Secretly Canadian's.

In February 2007, the partners behind Secretly Canadian and Jagjaguwar, along with Phil Waldorf, former label manager of Misra Records, announced a third label, Dead Oceans. The three labels share offices and staff in Bloomington, IN; however, they maintain distinct and separate aesthetic visions. In June 2013, The Numero Group, an existing re-issuer out of Chicago, joined forces with Secretly Canadian and the collection of labels known as Secretly Group.

All four labels are distributed by Secretly Group's in-house distribution arm, Secretly Distribution.

Artists

A number of artists have appeared on the four labels over the years.

Secretly Canadian

Jagjaguwar

Dead Oceans

Numero Group
Trevor Dandy
Syl Johnson
Julian Leal
Luxury
Caroline Peyton
Shoes

See also
List of record labels
Secretly Canadian
Jagjaguwar
Dead Oceans
Secretly Distribution

References

American record labels
Alternative rock record labels